Linda Boyden (born July 6, 1948) is a poet and children's books writer.

Background
Born in Attleboro, Massachusetts, Boyden is the daughter of Ray Simmons and Marie Dargis Simmons. She claims French-Canadian and Cherokee descent and is a member of the unrecognized United Lumbee Nation. As a child, she told stories to her dolls and to younger children. Enjoyment of reading led her to wish that she could be a writer. In 1970, she graduated from Framingham State College with a bachelor of science in education degree. She received a master's of education degree from the University of Virginia in 1992.

Career
Boyden began teaching first grade in a school in Baltimore in 1970 and taught "on and off" for 17 years. Her career focus shifted to writing after she and her husband moved to Maui in 1997. The first acceptance of her work by a publisher came in 2000.

Awards
Boyden received both the First Place Award and an Honorable Mention for her poems in the 5th Annual Pleasanton Poetry, Prose & Arts Festival. She was named Writer of the Year for Children's Books, 2002-2003 by the Wordcraft Circle of Native Writers and Storytellers. Wordcraft Circle also named The Blue Roses its Book of the Year for Children's Literature. The Blue Roses has received the 2003 Paterson Prize for Books for Young People, in the pre-K-3 division, sponsored by The Poetry Center at Passaic County Community College. The book is also included in the University of Wisconsin, Madison's Cooperative Children's Books Center Choices 2003 list. In 2000, Boyden won the Lee & Low Books first New Voices Award for her book The Blue Roses. The award was accompanied by a contract for publication and a $1,000 cash grant.

Personal life 
In 1988, she married engineer John P. Boyden.

Books by Linda Boyden or containing her work

Children's Books 
The Blue Roses, Lee and Low Books, 2002.
Powwow's Coming, University of New Mexico Press, 2007

Anthologies
Woven on the Wind: Women Write about Friendship in the Sagebrush West, Linda Hasselstrom, Gaydell Collier, Nancy Curtis (Editors), Mariner Books, 2001.
Through the Eye of the Deer, Carolyn Dunn & Carol Comfort (Editors), Consortium Books, 1999.
Maui Muses, Vol. II, edited by Maui Live Poets, 1997.

Notes

External links
Linda Boyden: Author & Storyteller

Living people
Writers from Hawaii
American people of Cherokee descent
American people of French-Canadian descent
American people who self-identify as being of Native American descent
1948 births
20th-century American women writers
21st-century American women writers
American women children's writers
American children's writers